The Iranian ambassador in Jakarta is the official representative of the Government in Tehran to the Government of Indonesia.

List of representatives

References 

 
Indonesia
Iran